Swadesh Darshan Scheme (Hindi :  स्वदेश दर्शन योजना) is a scheme of Ministry of Tourism under Government of India. The scheme aims to promote, develop and harness the potential of tourism in India.

Funding
This is a central sector scheme; i.e. - 100% funded by Central Government of India. Also efforts are made to achieve convergence with other schemes of Central and State Governments. The funding available for Corporate Social Responsibility (CSR) initiatives of Central Public Sector Undertakings and Corporate Sector is also used in this scheme.

Circles
The entire scheme is based on theme-based tourism. Each theme is called a "circuit" and composed of various tourist destinations. Tourist Circuit is defined as "a route having at least three major tourist destinations which are distinct and apart. Circuits should have well defined entry and exit points. A tourist who enters should get motivated to visit most of the places identified in the circuit."

List
 Buddhist circle
 Coastal circle
 Desert circle
 Eco circle
 Heritage circle
 Himalayan circle
 Krishna circle
 North-East circle
 Ramayana circle
 Rural circle
 Spiritual circle
 Sufi circle
 Tirthankar circle
 Tribal circle
 Wildlife circle

References

Tourism in India